Coast Casinos Inc. is a wholly owned subsidiary of Boyd Gaming Corporation based in Paradise, Nevada.  Coast Casinos is the number 2 locals casino brand in the Las Vegas market behind Station Casinos.

History
Principally owned and founded by Michael Gaughan.

Barbary Coast Hotel and Casino opens on March 2, 1979.

Gold Coast Hotel and Casino opens  on December 21, 1986.

The Orleans opens on December 28, 1996. Orleans Arena opens on May 25, 2003.

Suncoast Hotel and Casino opens on September 12, 2000.

On February 10, 2004 announced plans to merge with Boyd Gaming for $820 million. The buyout was complete on July 1 at a cost of $1.2 billion.

South Coast Casino opened on December 22, 2005.

The South Coast changed ownership on October 26, 2006 with Michael Gaughan taking over as sole owner.  The South Coast Equestrian Arena was included in the sale.  South Coast was renamed South Point Hotel, Casino & Spa.

Business units
Barbary Coast Hotel and Casino
Gold Coast Hotel and Casino
The Orleans Hotel and Casino
Orleans Arena
South Coast Casino
Suncoast Hotel and Casino

References

External links
 Coast Casinos official website

Hospitality companies of the United States
Companies based in Paradise, Nevada
Gambling companies of the United States
Boyd Gaming